WHGS (1270 AM) is a silent radio station licensed to Hampton, South Carolina, United States. The station is owned by Bocock Communications, LLC and features programming from CNN Radio.

References

External links

HGS
Radio stations established in 1957
1957 establishments in South Carolina